Population is the term typically used to refer to the number of people in a single area. Governments conduct a census to quantify the size of a resident population within a given jurisdiction. The term is also applied to animals, microorganisms, and plants, and has specific uses within such fields as ecology and genetics.

Use of the term

Social sciences 
In sociology and population geography, population refers to a group of human beings with some predefined criterion in common, such as location, race, ethnicity, nationality, or religion. Demography is a social science which entails the statistical study of populations.

Ecology 

In ecology, a population is a group of organisms of the same species who inhabit the same particular geographical area and are capable of interbreeding. The area of a sexual population is the area where inter-breeding is possible between any pair within the area and more probable than cross-breeding with individuals from other areas.

In ecology, the population of a certain species in a certain area can be estimated using the Lincoln index to calculate the total population of an area based on the number of individuals observed.

Genetics 

In genetics, a population is often defined as a set of organisms in which any pair of members can breed together. This means that they can regularly exchange gametes to produce normally-fertile offspring, and such a breeding group is also known therefore as a gamodeme. This also implies that all members belong to the same species.
If the gamodeme is very large (theoretically, approaching infinity), and all gene alleles are uniformly distributed by the gametes within it, the gamodeme is said to be panmictic. Under this state, allele (gamete) frequencies can be converted to genotype (zygote) frequencies by expanding an appropriate quadratic equation, as shown by Sir Ronald Fisher in his establishment of quantitative genetics.

This seldom occurs in nature: localization of gamete exchange – through dispersal limitations, preferential mating, cataclysm, or other cause – may lead to small actual gamodemes which exchange gametes reasonably uniformly within themselves but are virtually separated from their neighboring gamodemes. However, there may be low frequencies of exchange with these neighbors. This may be viewed as the breaking up of a large sexual population (panmictic) into smaller overlapping sexual populations. This failure of panmixia leads to two important changes in overall population structure: (1) the component gamodemes vary (through gamete sampling) in their allele frequencies when compared with each other and with the theoretical panmictic original (this is known as dispersion, and its details can be estimated using expansion of an appropriate binomial equation); and (2) the level of homozygosity rises in the entire collection of gamodemes. The overall rise in homozygosity is quantified by the inbreeding coefficient (f or φ). Note that all homozygotes are increased in frequency – both the deleterious and the desirable. The mean phenotype of the gamodemes collection is lower than that of the panmictic original – which is known as inbreeding depression. It is most important to note, however, that some dispersion lines will be superior to the panmictic original, while some will be about the same, and some will be inferior. The probabilities of each can be estimated from those binomial equations. In plant and animal breeding, procedures have been developed which deliberately utilize the effects of dispersion (such as line breeding, pure-line breeding, backcrossing). It can be shown that dispersion-assisted selection leads to the greatest genetic advance (ΔG=change in the phenotypic mean), and is much more powerful than selection acting without attendant dispersion. This is so for both allogamous (random fertilization) and autogamous (self-fertilization) gamodemes.

World human population 

According to the UN the world's population surpassed 8 billion on 15 November 2022, a gain of 1 billion since 12 March 2012. According to a separate estimate by the United Nations, Earth's population exceeded seven billion in October 2011. According to UNFPA, growth to such an extent offers unprecedented challenges and opportunities to all of humanity.

According to papers published by the United States Census Bureau, the world population hit 6.5 billion on 24 February 2006. The United Nations Population Fund designated 12 October 1999 as the approximate day on which world population reached 6 billion. This was about 12 years after the world population reached 5 billion in 1987, and six years after the world population reached 5.5 billion in 1993. The population of countries such as Nigeria is not even known to the nearest million, so there is a considerable margin of error in such estimates.

Researcher Carl Haub calculated that a total of over 100 billion people have probably been born in the last 2000 years.

Predicted growth and decline 

Population growth increased significantly as the Industrial Revolution gathered pace from 1700 onwards. The last 50 years have seen a yet more rapid increase in the rate of population growth due to medical advances and substantial increases in agricultural productivity, particularly beginning in the 1960s, made by the Green Revolution. In 2017 the United Nations Population Division projected that the world's population will reach about 9.8 billion in 2050 and 11.2 billion in 2100.

In the future, the world's population is expected to peak, after which it will decline due to economic reasons, health concerns, land exhaustion and environmental hazards. According to one report, it is very likely that the world's population will stop growing before the end of the 21st century. Further, there is some likelihood that population will actually decline before 2100. Population has already declined in the last decade or two in Eastern Europe, the Baltics and in the Commonwealth of Independent States.

The population pattern of less-developed regions of the world in recent years has been marked by gradually declining birth rates. These followed an earlier sharp reduction in death rates. This transition from high birth and death rates to low birth and death rates is often referred to as the demographic transition.

Population planning 

Human population planning is the practice of altering the rate of growth of a human population. Historically, human population control has been implemented with the goal of limiting the rate of population growth. In the period from the 1950s to the 1980s, concerns about global population growth and its effects on poverty, environmental degradation, and political stability led to efforts to reduce population growth rates. While population control can involve measures that improve people's lives by giving them greater control of their reproduction, a few programs, most notably the Chinese government's one-child per family policy, have resorted to coercive measures.

In the 1970s, tension grew between population control advocates and women's health activists who advanced women's reproductive rights as part of a human rights-based approach. Growing opposition to the narrow population control focus led to a significant change in population control policies in the early 1980s.

See also 
 Community (ecology)
 Human overpopulation
 List of countries by population
 Lists of organisms by population
 Population ethics
Population geography

References

External links 
 United Nations Population Division
 CICRED homepage a platform for interaction between research centres and international organizations, such as the United Nations Population Division, UNFPA, WHO and FAO.
 Population Reference Bureau analyzes demographic data and research providing objective, accurate, and up-to-date population information in accessible formats.
 Current World Population
 NECSP HomePage
 Overpopulation
 Population World: Population of World. Retrieved 13 February 2004.
 SIEDS, Italian Society of Economics Demography and Statistics
  of the United Nations Economic Commission for Europe
 World Population Counter, and separate regions.
 WorldPopClock.com. 
 Populations du monde. 
 OECD population data
  Understanding the World Today Reports about world and regional population trends
 

 
Demography
Countries
Population ecology
Population models